Pseudogagrella is a genus of harvestmen in the family Sclerosomatidae from East Asia.

Species
 Pseudogagrella amamiana (Nakatsudi, 1942) - Japan
 Pseudogagrella andoi Suzuki, 1977 - Taiwan
 Pseudogagrella arishana Suzuki, 1977 - Taiwan
 Pseudogagrella chekiangensis Wang, 1941 - China
 Pseudogagrella cyanea (Roewer, 1915) - Taiwan, Japan
 Pseudogagrella dorsomaculata Chen & Shih, 2017 - Taiwan
 Pseudogagrella minuta Roewer, 1957 - China
 Pseudogagrella multimaculata Roewer, 1957 - Indonesia 
 Pseudogagrella nigridorsa Chen & Shih, 2017 - Taiwan
 Pseudogagrella pingi Wang, 1941 - China
 Pseudogagrella sakishimensis Suzuki, 1971 - Japan
 Pseudogagrella sauteri Chen & Shih, 2017 - Taiwan
 Pseudogagrella similis Wang, 1941 - China
 Pseudogagrella sinensis Redikorzev, 1936 - China
 Pseudogagrella splendens (With, 1903)  - China, Japan
 Pseudogagrella taiwana Suzuki, 1977 - Taiwan
 Pseudogagrella wangi Roewer, 1957 - China

References

Harvestmen
Harvestman genera